Çanaqçı (known as Ağamalı until 2011) is a village and municipality in the Gadabay Rayon of Azerbaijan.  It has a population of 1,571.

It is located within 7 kilometers from the old Doukhobor-Molokan village of Slavyanka in the Lesser Caucasus Mountains along the river Misderesi. At the entrance to the village is a monument to residents who died in World War II.

It was named Ağamalı in 1929 in honour of Samad aga Agamalioglu. In 2011 the name was officially changed to Çanaqçı.

Social and economic institutions
The municipality contains general secondary schools, a hospital, livestock farms, grocery stores, a bakery, a machine and tractor station, a local radio and phone unit.

References 

Populated places in Gadabay District